Jessy Lanza is a Canadian electronic songwriter, producer, and vocalist from Hamilton, Ontario, Canada. She has released three albums, Pull My Hair Back (2013), Oh No (2016) and All the Time (2020), to critical praise on UK label Hyperdub.

Life and career
Lanza grew up playing piano and clarinet before going to Concordia University to study jazz. Before starting her career as a singer and music producer, she worked as a music teacher.

Lanza was listed as one of the best new artists of 2013 by XLR8R. In a review of her debut album, Pull My Hair Back, she was described by The Guardian as "the latest and possibly greatest of the new ethereal soul girls" and ranked No. 4 on Resident Advisor'''s Top 20 Albums of 2013. Pull My Hair Back was co-written and co-produced with Jeremy Greenspan of Junior Boys and released on the UK's Hyperdub record label. The album Pull My Hair Back was a shortlisted nominee for the 2014 Polaris Music Prize.

In 2014, Lanza collaborated with Caribou on his album Our Love. In 2015, she recorded vocals for The Galleria EP Calling Card / Mezzanine. The duo released a single in 2019 titled Stop & Go.

Her second album Oh No was released in 2016, and was shortlisted again for the 2016 Polaris Music Prize.

Her third album All the Time was released in July 2020.

Influences
Lanza possesses a soprano vocal range, similar to Elizabeth Fraser and Aaliyah. As a child, Lanza listened to Janet Jackson and Paula Abdul. The singer said that having a background in studying jazz helped her to have "the ability to hear and lift chord progressions", which led her to an understanding of R&B music that permeates her recent work. Laced with funk, soul, R&B, and haunting high-register vocals, Lanza cites Missy Elliott and Timbaland as early influences on her songwriting. The singer has also cited such artists as Evelyn "Champagne" King and Melba Moore. She also cited Japanese synthpop artists of the 1970s and 1980s, such as Yellow Magic Orchestra members Haruomi Hosono, Ryuichi Sakamoto, and Yukihiro Takahashi, as key influences. She has a postmodern approach to writing music, comparing her songs to a mashup of all the pop songs over the last 40 years that she likes.

Discography
Studio albums
 Pull My Hair Back (2013)
 Oh No (2016)
 All the Time (2020)
 ‘’DJ-Kicks’’ (2021)

EPs
 You Never Show Your Love'' (2015)

Singles
 "Beach Mode" (2013) Ikonika feature
 "Kathy Lee" (2013)
 "Keep Moving" (2013)
 "5785021" (2014)
 "You and Me" (2014)
 "You Never Show Your Love" (2015)  
 "It Means I Love You" (2016)
 "VV Violence" (2016)
 "Oh No" (2016)
 "Lick in Heaven" (2020)
 "Face" (2020)
 "Anyone Around" (2020)

References

Living people
Canadian electronic musicians
1985 births
Musicians from Hamilton, Ontario
Hyperdub artists
Canadian women in electronic music
Canadian sopranos
21st-century Canadian women singers
Canadian contemporary R&B singers